Joseph S. Muscaglione (born February 28, 1963 in Passaic, New Jersey), is a food and wine gourmand, chef and sommelier. Having started in the restaurant business as a teenager, by age 21 he created one of New Jersey's most eclectic wine lists, at award winning Foro Italico Restaurant. At Foro Italico, the Wine Spectator Magazine awarded its wine list with the "Award of Excellence" 6 years in a row. Muscaglione has been featured in the Wine Spectator Magazine, The Bergen Record and The New York Times.  In an NY Times article written on October 21, 2001, writer David Corcoran  states "Be sure to spend some quality time with Foro Italico's wine guy, Joseph Muscaglione."

He spent seven years in Italy, mastering the details of its wine industry. Upon returning to the United States, he spent time as a consultant for two premier wine importers of fine Italian wines - Winebow and Vinifera.

Married to Danish model Sarah Willeman, in 2000, they divorced after 4 years of marriage. They have no children.

In Las Vegas since 2003, Muscaglione helped open the world's highest grossing restaurant, Tao Asian Bistro located inside The Venetian hotel, where he created the wine list, cocktail, specialty drink list and bottle list for TAO Asian Bistro and Nightclub, at which he was Beverage Director. In its first year, TAO grossed over 53 million dollars.

Muscaglione is now Nevada State VP for BMC Fine Spirits an importer and distributor of boutique wines, specialty beer and rare spirits.

References

Living people
1963 births
People from Passaic, New Jersey
Sommeliers